The 1984 SEC Men’s Basketball Tournament took place from March 7–10, 1984 at the Memorial Gymnasium on Vanderbilt University’s campus located in Nashville, Tennessee. The Kentucky Wildcats won the tournament and received the SEC's automatic bid to the 1984 NCAA Division I Men’s Basketball tournament by defeating the Auburn Tigers by a score of 51–49 in the championship game on March 10. Kentucky’s tournament championship win marked the first time a regular season champion won the tournament championship since the revival of the SEC Tournament in 1979.

Television coverage 
Television coverage of the entire tournament was produced and regionally syndicated by the now-defunct Sports Productions, Inc. (SPI), a division of Lorimar Productions. The broadcast crew consisted of Tom Hammond with the play-by-play announcing, and Joe Dean with the color analogy. However, the championship game on Sunday, March 10, was televised by NBC in areas outside the SEC’s geographical footprint (with Don Criqui and Bucky Waters calling the action.), with the SPI broadcast being shown within the SEC footprint.

Bracket

References

SEC men's basketball tournament
1983–84 Southeastern Conference men's basketball season
Basketball competitions in Nashville, Tennessee
1984 in sports in Tennessee
College sports tournaments in Tennessee
20th century in Nashville, Tennessee